Jonathan Nolan (born 6 June 1976) is a British-American screenwriter, producer, director and author. He is the creator of the CBS science fiction series Person of Interest (2011–2016) and co-creator of the HBO science fiction western series Westworld (2016–2022).

Nolan has collaborated on several films with his brother, director Christopher Nolan, who adapted Jonathan's short story "Memento Mori" into the neo-noir thriller film Memento (2000). Together, the brothers co-wrote the mystery thriller film The Prestige (2006), the superhero films The Dark Knight (2008) and The Dark Knight Rises (2012), and the science fiction film Interstellar (2014).

Nolan was nominated for the Academy Award for Best Original Screenplay for Memento, and for the Primetime Emmy Award for Outstanding Writing for a Drama Series and Outstanding Directing for a Drama Series for Westworld, among a number of other awards.

Early life
Jonathan Nolan was born in London, the youngest of three boys. His father Brendan Nolan is British and his mother Christina Nolan is American. He was raised in both London and Chicago. Nolan attended Georgetown University, where he majored in English and was a staff writer for The Hoya.

Career

Nolan's short story "Memento Mori" was used by his older brother, director Christopher Nolan, as the basis for the film Memento. Although Jonathan received a "based on a story by" credit, not a screenwriting credit, the brothers shared a nomination for the Academy Award for Best Original Screenplay as the film was released before the story was published.

In 2005, Jonathan and Christopher co-wrote the screenplay for The Prestige, which is based on Christopher Priest's novel of the same title. The brothers collaborated on the screenplay for the 2008 film The Dark Knight. The film went on to become the most financially successful Batman film, which has since been surpassed by its sequel, The Dark Knight Rises.

On 10 February 2011, CBS picked up Nolan's pilot Person of Interest. The show was officially picked up by CBS on 13 May 2011 to air in fall 2011. The series ran for five seasons and starred Jim Caviezel, Taraji P. Henson and Michael Emerson. Nolan served as executive producer along with J. J. Abrams.

Nolan wrote the screenplay for Interstellar, a science-fiction feature based on the works of theoretical physicist Kip Thorne, who served as the film's executive producer. Christopher Nolan co-wrote, directed and produced the film, with Paramount distributing domestically, while Warner Bros. distributed internationally.

Nolan and Lisa Joy wrote a pilot for an adaptation of Westworld, Michael Crichton's 1973 science fiction Western thriller of the same name. On 31 August 2013, it was announced that HBO had ordered a pilot for a show, with Nolan, Joy, Weintraub, J. J. Abrams, and Bryan Burk as executive producers, and Nolan making his directorial debut. The pilot was subsequently picked up to series, with Nolan and Joy as co-showrunners, and premiered on 2 October 2016. In November 2016, HBO renewed the show for a 10-episode second season, that started in April 2018. On 1 May 2018, following the first two episodes of Season 2, the series was renewed for a third season. Nolan and Lisa Joy signed a $150 million deal to create The Peripheral  for Amazon.

Personal life

Nolan found that having an English accent was very unpopular after moving to Chicago, so he learned to "sound like a good Chicago kid."

When contemplating the artistic differences between himself and his brother, Nolan remarked: "I've always suspected that it has something to do with the fact that he's left-handed and I'm right-handed, because he is somehow able to look at my ideas and flip them around in a way that's just a bit more twisted and interesting. It's great to be able to work with him that way."

Nolan is married to Burn Notice writer and Westworld co-creator and executive producer Lisa Joy. They have a daughter and a son together.

Filmography

Film

Television

Bibliography
Short fiction
 "Memento Mori" (2001) – short story basis for Memento (2000)

References

External links

 

1976 births
Living people
American male screenwriters
American male short story writers
American people of English descent
Television producers from Illinois
American television writers
English people of American descent
English screenwriters
English male screenwriters
English short story writers
English television producers
English television writers
Georgetown University alumni
American male television writers
Writers from Chicago
Writers from London
Screenwriters from Illinois
Showrunners